Iga Świątek was the defending champion, but chose to compete in the women's singles competition instead. She lost to Viktorija Golubic in the first round.

Daria Snigur won the title, defeating Alexa Noel 6−4, 6−4  in the final.

Seeds

Draw

Finals

Top half

Section 1

Section 2

Bottom half

Section 3

Section 4

Qualifying

Seeds

Qualifiers

Draw

First qualifier

Second qualifier

Third qualifier

Fourth qualifier

Fifth qualifier

Sixth qualifier

Seventh qualifier

Eighth qualifier

References

External links
 Draw

Girls' Singles
Wimbledon Championship by year – Girls' singles